State Highway 121 (SH 121) is a 30.425 mile (48.96 km) long state highway in the U.S. state of Colorado. SH 121's southern terminus is at Waterton Road near Littleton, and the northern terminus is at U.S. Route 287 (US 287) in Broomfield.

Route description

The route, also known as Wadsworth Boulevard, Wadsworth Bypass, and Wadsworth Parkway, starts at a junction with Waterton Road in unincorporated Jefferson County (near Littleton and at the entrance to the main plant of Lockheed Martin Space Systems) and ends at the junction of U.S. Route 36, U.S. Route 287, and State Highway 128 in Broomfield at a trumpet interchange. State Highway 121 passes through portions of southwest Denver County.

History
The name Wadsworth comes from Benjamin Franklin Wadsworth, one of the founders and first postmaster of Arvada.  In northwest Arvada, Wadsworth Boulevard passes over Hackberry Hill at the site where a landmark hackberry tree, for which the hill was named, stood before it was cut down to make room for the highway in 1937.

Major intersections

References

External links

121
Transportation in Jefferson County, Colorado
Transportation in Lakewood, Colorado
Wheat Ridge, Colorado
Arvada, Colorado
Westminster, Colorado
Transportation in Broomfield, Colorado
Transportation in Denver